Jonathan S. Bush (born March 10, 1969) is an American technology entrepreneur, best known as the cofounder and former chief executive officer of athenahealth, a Watertown, Massachusetts-based healthcare technology company founded in 1997. On June 6, 2018, Bush resigned from his position as CEO of athenahealth during an activist campaign by Elliott Management.

Early life and education 
Bush is the son of Jonathan Bush, cousin of U.S. President George W. Bush, nephew of U.S. President George H. W. Bush, and brother of television presenter Billy Bush. He grew up in Manhattan and attended the Allen-Stevenson School.

Bush graduated from the Phillips Academy college preparatory school in Andover, Massachusetts. He attended Boston University for one year in 1988–89, graduated from Wesleyan University in 1993 with a Bachelor of Arts degree in The College of Social studies, and earned a Master of Business Administration degree from Harvard University in 1997.

Business career

Early career 
Just before coming to Wesleyan, Bush took time off from his studies to work on George H. W. Bush's 1988 presidential campaign. As an EMT, Bush spent a summer vacation during college operating a 911-response ambulance in New Orleans. In 1991, Bush volunteered to become a combat medic at the start of Operation Desert Storm, doing boot camp at Fort Jackson in South Carolina, but did not ship out because the war ended before he finished.

The business side of Bush's training stemmed from his time as an associate of J. Bush & Company, Inc., a firm founded by his father that assisted foreign embassies in banking, and as a consultant at Booz Allen Hamilton, where he was a member of its Managed Care Strategy Group.

athenahealth 
In 1997, Bush and Todd Park, a colleague from Booz Allen, founded Athena Women's Health, a women's health and birthing clinic housed in San Diego for soon-to-be, new, and current mothers. After Park's brother Ed Park helped develop its system, Athena Women's Health transformed into athenahealth, a healthcare technology platform offering a suite of services to help hospital and ambulatory providers coordinate care and work at the tops of their licenses. In 2000, Bush raised more than $10 million in venture capital funding to support athenahealth, which launched a successful IPO in 2007. Bush was athenahealth's CEO until his resignation on June 6, 2018.

Zus Health 
Bush is listed as the Founder & Chief Executive Officer of Zus Health.

Publications 
Bush is the author, with Stephen L. Baker, of the New York Times bestseller Where Does It Hurt?: An Entrepreneur's Guide to Fixing Health Care (Penguin, May 2014). He is also a frequent contributor to Harvard Business Review, Forbes, and STAT, and to podcasts like POLITICO Pulse Check.

Honors and awards 
In 2013, Bush was named CEO of the Year by the Massachusetts Technology Leadership Council (MassTLC). In 2016 he received the Tufts Medical Center's Ellen M. Zane Award for Visionary Leadership. Fortune included Bush as a "disruptor" in its list of "34 Leaders Who Are Changing Healthcare," writing that "few are more persuasive—and outspoken—about the need to repair our healthcare system."

Personal life

Bush is married and has six children. In May 2018, a report detailed Bush's verbal and physical abuse towards his first wife. Claims were dropped after further investigation. He is currently married to Fay Rotenberg.

References

External links
 Official athenahealth biography

1969 births
Living people
American health care chief executives
Bush family
Harvard Business School alumni
Wesleyan University alumni
Place of birth missing (living people)